Crosslandia is a genus of sea slugs, in the family Scyllaeidae. Members of this genus inhabit areas such as the Pacific coast of Central America, and the Indo-West Pacific.

Species 

 Crosslandia daedali Poorman & Mulliner, 1981
 Crosslandia viridis Eliot, 1902

References 

Scyllaeidae